Kitchen Stories is a 2003 Norwegian film by Bent Hamer, director of Eggs and O' Horten.

Plot
Swedish efficiency researchers come to Norway to study Norwegian men, in an effort to help optimize their use of their kitchens. Folke Nilsson (Tomas Norström) is assigned to study the habits of Isak Bjørvik (Joachim Calmeyer). By the rules of the research institute, Folke has to sit on an umpire's chair in Isak's kitchen and observe him from there, but never talk to him. Isak volunteered for the program with the promise of a horse, but he only receives a dala horse, a little painted wooden statue.

Isak stops using his kitchen and observes Folke through a hole in the ceiling instead. The two lonely men, observer and observed, slowly overcome the initial Norwegian-Swede and subject-observer distrust and become friends. Isak's friend Grant visits him often.  Grant is a concentration camp survivor and feels Folke is stealing his friend.

The friendship between Folke and Isak costs Folke his job during an inspection. He is forced to leave and drive up to the Swedish border, but then he returns, only to find Isak has died of a broken heart. Folke, now alone, occupies Isak's home and takes up Isak's friendship with Grant.

Inspiration for the film
Bent Hamer was amused after perusing post-World War II research books on the efficiency of the Swedish housewife, and pondered on the idea of research being done on men. This led him to make the film Kitchen Stories with Swedish researchers and a Norwegian man as the main character.

Cast 
Joachim Calmeyer as Isak Bjørvik, the man in the kitchen
Tomas Norström as Folke Nilsson, the Swedish researcher
Bjørn Floberg as Grant, the friend of Isak
Reine Brynolfsson as Malmberg
Sverre Anker Ousdal as Dr. Jack Zac. Benjaminsen, Swedish researcher
Leif Andrée as Dr. Ljungberg, Swedish researcher
Gard B. Eidsvold ground crew
Lennart Jähkel as Green
Trond Brænne as spokesman
Bjørn Jenseg as caretaker
Jan Gunnar Røise as assistant caretaker
Karin Lunden as female corporate assistant

Awards
 Best Film, Amanda Award, Norway 2003
 Best Director, Copenhagen International Film Festival 2003
 Best Director, São Paulo International Film Festival 2003
 FIPRESCI Prize, Tromsø International Film Festival 2003

External links
 

2003 films
2003 comedy-drama films
Films directed by Bent Hamer
2000s Norwegian-language films
Swedish-language films
Films set in the 1950s
Norwegian-Swedish films
Norwegian comedy-drama films
Swedish comedy-drama films
Norway–Sweden relations
2000s Swedish films